Corrine "Corie" Beveridge (born 1974) is a Canadian curler.

Awards
 All-Star Team:

Personal life
Beveridge is a graduate of Markham District High School. She attended McMaster University in mechanical engineering.

Teams and events

References

External links
 
 Corie Beveridge - Curling Canada Stats Archive
 Corie Beveridge ; Lisa Rowsell; Kim Gellard and Debbie Green win big. News Photo - Getty Images

Living people
Canadian women curlers
Curlers from Ontario
World curling champions
Canadian women's curling champions
Sportspeople from Markham, Ontario
1974 births
McMaster University alumni